Sador can mean:

 Gamma Cygni, a star commonly known as Sadr or Sador
 Sador, the chief villain in the movie Battle Beyond the Stars
 Sador, a fictional place in the Obernewtyn Chronicles
 Sador Andor, a novel by Dilara Hashim

See also
Sadr (disambiguation)
Sodor (disambiguation)